Enfant terrible is a French expression referring to a child who says candid things, or an unorthodox genius.

Enfant terrible or Enfant Terrible may also refer to:

 Enfant terrible (folklore), a character in African mythological culture
 Enfant Terrible (film), a 2020 German drama film

See also
 Les Enfants Terribles (disambiguation)